Connaughton is an Irish surname. Notable people with the surname include:

Brian Connaughton (1899–1983), Irish policeman, recipient of the Scott Medal
Brian Connaughton (born 1942/43), Irish cyclist
Frank Connaughton (1869–1942), American baseball player
Gary Connaughton, inter-county Gaelic footballer for Westmeath
Harry Connaughton (1905–1969), American football player
James L. Connaughton (born 1961), American energy industry lawyer and former environmental advisor
Jared Connaughton (born 1985), Canadian sprinter
John Connaughton (1949–2022), English former professional football goalkeeper
Joseph Connaughton (1918–1944), English cricketer
Mary Z. Connaughton (born 1960), former board member of the Massachusetts Turnpike Authority
Pat Connaughton (born 1993), American basketball and baseball player
Paul Connaughton Snr (born 1944), Irish former Fine Gael politician
Paul Connaughton Jnr (born 1982), Irish Fine Gael politician
Richard Connaughton (born 1942), British Army officer and author specialised in military history
Sean Connaughton (born 1961), former Secretary of Transportation for the Commonwealth of Virginia
Shane Connaughton (born 1941), Irish writer and actor, co-writer of the screenplay for My Left Foot